The New York, Ontario, and Western Railroad Passenger Station is located on Institution Road, between Eastern Correctional Facility and Rondout Creek, near Napanoch, New York, United States.

History
It was built by the New York, Ontario and Western Railway (O&W) in 1903 for the dual purpose of bringing tourists to Napanoch and inmates to the newly established prison. A branch from Ellenville to Kerhonkson was opened in 1902, following the recently abandoned Delaware and Hudson Canal, a portion of which survives just west of the station building. A temporary station at the present site served passengers while the New York City firm of Jackson, Rosencrans & Canfield designed and built a permanent station in a Classical Revival style.

O&W passenger service ended in September 1953, and the original domed roof had deteriorated to the point that it was replaced with the current tiled version. Trackage was dismantled in 1958, the year after the O&W was liquidated.

Preservation
The station became the property of the state Department of Correctional Services, which owned the surrounding land as part of the prison property.

It was later renovated and reopened as a museum devoted to its past and the O&W. A small section of track was restored, with several railroad artifacts on display.

References

Former railway stations in New York (state)
Railway stations in Ulster County, New York
National Register of Historic Places in Ulster County, New York
Railway stations on the National Register of Historic Places in New York (state)
Railway stations in the United States opened in 1903
Neoclassical architecture in New York (state)
Railway stations closed in 1953
1903 establishments in New York (state)
Former New York, Ontario and Western Railway stations